Ada (or Adaköy) is a village in the central district Karaman of Karaman Province, Turkey. It is situated in the mountainous area to the south east of Karaman. It is called Ada (meaning "island") because it is almost surrounded by creeks. The population of the village was 435 as of 2011.

References

Villages in Karaman Central District